The members of the Parliament of Fiji from 1972 until 1977 consisted of members of the House of Representatives elected between 15 and 29 April 1972, and members of the nominated Senate.

House of Representatives

Senate

References

 1972